Aksu Hongqipo Airport  is an airport located in Onsu County, serving the city of Aksu and the namesake prefecture,  in the autonomous region of Xinjiang, China.

Facilities
It has one runway designated 09/27 which measures .

Airlines and destinations

See also
 List of airports in the People's Republic of China

References

External links
 

Airports in Xinjiang